The 2016 Copa Libertadores final stages were played from 26 April to 27 July 2016. A total of 16 teams competed in the final stages to decide the champions of the 2016 Copa Libertadores. Atlético Nacional won the title by defeating Independiente del Valle in the finals.

Qualified teams

The winners and runners-up of each of the eight groups in the second stage qualified for the final stages.

Seeding

The qualified teams were seeded in the final stages according to their results in the second stage, with the group winners seeded 1–8, and the group runners-up seeded 9–16.

Format

In the final stages, the 16 teams played a single-elimination tournament, with the following rules:
Each tie was played on a home-and-away two-legged basis, with the higher-seeded team hosting the second leg (Regulations Article 3.4). However, CONMEBOL required that the second leg of the finals had to be played in South America, i.e., if there was a finalist from Mexico, they would have to host the first leg regardless of seeding (Regulations Article 3.7b).
In the round of 16, quarterfinals, and semifinals, if tied on aggregate, the away goals rule would be used. If still tied, extra time would not be played, and the penalty shoot-out would be used to determine the winner (Regulations Article 5.2).
In the finals, if tied on aggregate, the away goals rule would not be used, and 30 minutes of extra time would be played. If still tied after extra time, the penalty shoot-out would be used to determine the winner (Regulations Article 5.3).
If there were two semifinalists from the same association, they would have to play each other (Regulations Article 3.6).

Bracket
The bracket of the final stages was determined by the seeding as follows:
Round of 16:
Match A: Seed 1 vs. Seed 16
Match B: Seed 2 vs. Seed 15
Match C: Seed 3 vs. Seed 14
Match D: Seed 4 vs. Seed 13
Match E: Seed 5 vs. Seed 12
Match F: Seed 6 vs. Seed 11
Match G: Seed 7 vs. Seed 10
Match H: Seed 8 vs. Seed 9
Quarterfinals:
Match S1: Winner A vs. Winner H
Match S2: Winner B vs. Winner G
Match S3: Winner C vs. Winner F
Match S4: Winner D vs. Winner E
Semifinals: (if there were two semifinalists from the same association, they would have to play each other)
Match F1: Winner S1 vs. Winner S4
Match F2: Winner S2 vs. Winner S3
Finals: Winner F1 vs. Winner F2

Round of 16
The first legs were played on 26–28 April, and the second legs were played on 3–5 May 2016.

|}

Match A

Atlético Nacional won 4–2 on aggregate and advanced to the quarterfinals (Match S1).

Match B

UNAM won 2–1 on aggregate and advanced to the quarterfinals (Match S2).

Match C

Tied 2–2 on aggregate, Nacional won on away goals and advanced to the quarterfinals (Match S3).

Match D

Atlético Mineiro won 2–1 on aggregate and advanced to the quarterfinals (Match S4).

Match E

São Paulo won 5–3 on aggregate and advanced to the quarterfinals (Match S4).

Match F

Boca Juniors won 5–2 on aggregate and advanced to the quarterfinals (Match S3).

Match G

Independiente del Valle won 2–1 on aggregate and advanced to the quarterfinals (Match S2).

Match H

Rosario Central won 4–0 on aggregate and advanced to the quarterfinals (Match S1).

Quarterfinals
The first legs were played on 11–12 and 17 May, and the second legs were played on 18–19 and 24 May 2016.

|}

Match S1

Atlético Nacional won 3–2 on aggregate and advanced to the semifinals (Match F1).

Match S2

Tied 3–3 on aggregate, Independiente del Valle won on penalties and advanced to the semifinals (Match F2).

Match S3

Tied 2–2 on aggregate, Boca Juniors won on penalties and advanced to the semifinals (Match F2).

Match S4

Tied 2–2 on aggregate, São Paulo won on away goals and advanced to the semifinals (Match F1).

Semifinals
The first legs were played on 6–7 July, and the second legs were played on 13–14 July 2016.

|}

Match F1

Atlético Nacional won 4–1 on aggregate and advanced to the finals.

Match F2

Independiente del Valle won 5–3 on aggregate and advanced to the finals.

Finals

The first leg was played on 20 July, and the second leg was played on 27 July 2016.
|}

Atlético Nacional won 2–1 on aggregate.

References

External links
 
Copa Libertadores 2016, CONMEBOL.com 

3